Victor Mordechai Goldschmidt (10 February 1853 in Mainz – 8 May 1933 in Salzburg) was a German mineralogist, natural philosopher, and art collector.

Life 
Born 1853 in Mainz, Goldschmidt attended the Bergakademie Freiberg in Saxony and graduated in engineering in 1874. He received his doctorate in 1880 in Heidelberg for his work on mechanical rock analysis and continued his studies in Vienna from 1882 to 1887.  In 1888 he wrote his habilitation about "Projektion und graphische Krystallberechnung" (Projection and graphical Crystal Classification) under the same supervisor as his doctoral dissertation. He founded the Institut für Mineralogie und Kristallographie in Heidelberg in association with the Josefine and Eduard von Portheim Stiftung, which he founded in memory of his maternal ancestors. In 1893, he became an adjunct professor (Honorarprofessor) at the University of Heidelberg and in 1913, he was awarded membership in the Heidelberger Akademie der Wissenschaften (Heidelberg Academy of Sciences). During his time on the faculty at Heidelberg, one of his famous students was the American volcanologist Thomas Jaggar.

His Atlas der Krystallformen developed from 1913 until 1923. Around this time, in 1917, he was made a geheimer Hofrat (similar to a Privy Councillor). During this period (1919/21), special chartered sea voyages were undertaken, covering Asia, Africa and Oceania, with very distinguished passengers on board, in parallel with the delayed founding of the League of Nations. In 1923, he was made an honorary member of the Naturhistorisch-Medizinischen Verein Heidelberg (Heidelberg Association for Natural History and Medicine). In 1919, he donated his and his wife's extensive collection of art and ethnographic artefacts to the state of Baden as the Josephine and Eduard von Portheim-Stiftung. In 1933, the curatorium of the "v. Portheim-Stiftung" gave its mineralogical-crystallographical institute the name Victor-Goldschmidt-Institut für Kristallforschung.

The Goldschmidts of Frankfurt, contributed significantly to the founding of the Goethe University Frankfurt.

Works 
 Index der Kristallformen, Catalogue of all known crystal forms of all minerals, 3 volumes, 1886-1891.
 
 Atlas der Krystallformen, 9 books, Verlag Winters, Heidelberg 1913-1923.

See also 
 Goldschmidt
 Goldschmidt family

References

External links 
 Atlas der Krystallformen
 http://www.voelkerkundemuseum-vpst.de

Academic staff of Heidelberg University
German mineralogists
German art collectors
19th-century art collectors
20th-century art collectors
Jewish German scientists
Scientists from Mainz
1853 births
1933 deaths
People from Rhenish Hesse
German male writers